HD 132406 b is a long period massive gas giant extrasolar planet orbiting the Sun-like star HD 132406. HD 132406 b has at least 5.61 times the mass of Jupiter. The orbital distance from the star is almost twice that of from Earth to the Sun. The orbital period is 2.7 years.

An astrometric measurement of the planet's inclination and true mass was published in 2022 as part of Gaia DR3.

References

External links 
 simulation HD 132406

Boötes
Giant planets
Exoplanets discovered in 2007
Exoplanets detected by radial velocity
Exoplanets detected by astrometry